Walter Chisholm (1 August 1862 – 1 August 1957) was a New Zealand cricketer. He played in one first-class match for Wellington in 1885/86.

See also
 List of Wellington representative cricketers

References

External links
 

1862 births
1957 deaths
New Zealand cricketers
Wellington cricketers
Cricketers from Wellington City